Petrosifungins are cyclodepsipeptides isolated from a sponge-residing Penicillium.

External links
 Petrosifungins A and B, novel cyclodepsipeptides from a sponge-derived strain of Penicillium brevicompactum

Depsipeptides